Pyrgulopsis is a genus of freshwater snails with a gill and an operculum, aquatic gastropod mollusks in the family Hydrobiidae.

Etymology 
The name Pyrgulopsis is composed from Pyrgula, another genus of snail, and opsis = aspect of.

Description 
Generic characters of the genus Pyrgulopsis are: the shell is minute, conically turreted, somewhat elongated, imperforate and unicarinate. The apex is acute. The aperture is ovate. The edge of the aperture, called the peritreme, is continuous. The operculum is ovate, thin, corneous and spiral, with polar point well forward and approximating the columella.

The jaw is thin and membranaceous. The radula is odontophore, with teeth are arranged in transverse rows, according to the formula 3 + 1 + 3. Formula for denticles of rhachidian: .

Distribution 
The distribution of the genus Pyrgulopsis includes Western and South-western United States. Snails of species in the genus Pyrgulopsis occur in fresh water and in brackish water.

Species 

Pyrgulopsis is the largest genus of freshwater gastropods in the North America. In 2014, 139 species were recognized in this genus.

Species in the genus Pyrgulopsis include:
Pyrgulopsis aardahli Hershler, 1989 - Benton Valley springsnail
Pyrgulopsis aloba Hershler, 1999 - Duckwater pyrg
Pyrgulopsis amargosae Hershler, 1989 - Amargosa springsnail
Pyrgulopsis anguina Hershler, 1989 - Longitudinal gland pyrg
Pyrgulopsis archimedis S. S. Berry, 1947 - archimedes pyrg	
Pyrgulopsis arizonae (Taylor, 1987) - Apache springsnail
Pyrgulopsis avernalis (Pilsbry, 1935) - Moapa pebblesnail
Pyrgulopsis bacchus Hershler, 1988 - Grand Wash springsnail
Pyrgulopsis bedfordensis Hershler & Gustafson, 2001
Pyrgulopsis bernardina (Taylor, 1987) - San Bernardino springsnail
Pyrgulopsis blainica Hershler, Liu & Gustafson, 2008
Pyrgulopsis bruneauensis Hershler, 1990 - Bruneau hot springsnail	
Pyrgulopsis bryantwalkeri Hershler, 1994 - Cortez Hills pebblesnail	
Pyrgulopsis californiensis (Gregg & Taylor, 1965) - Laguna Mountain springsnail
Pyrgulopsis carinifera (Pilsbry, 1935)
Pyrgulopsis castaicensis Hershler & Liu, 2010
Pyrgulopsis chamberlini (Hershler, 1998) - smooth Glenwood pyrg
Pyrgulopsis chupaderae (Taylor, 1987) - Chupadera springsnail
Pyrgulopsis coloradensis Hershler, 1998 - Blue Point pyrg
Pyrgulopsis conica Hershler, 1988 - Kingman springsnail
Pyrgulopsis cruciglans Hershler, 1998 - Transverse grand pyrg
Pyrgulopsis crystalis Hershler & Sada, 1987 - Crystal springsnail
Pyrgulopsis davisi (Taylor, 1987) - Limpia Creek springsnail
Pyrgulopsis deaconi Hershler, 1998 - Spring Mountains Pyrg
Pyrgulopsis deserta (Pilsbry, 1916) - desert springsnail
Pyrgulopsis diablensis Hershler, 1995 - Diablo Range pyrg
Pyrgulopsis eremica Hershler, 1995 - Smoke Creek pyrg
Pyrgulopsis erythropoma (Pilsbry, 1899) - Ash Meadows pebblesnail
Pyrgulopsis fairbanksensis Hershler & Sada, 1987 - Fairbanks springsnail
Pyrgulopsis fusca (Hershler, 1998) - Otter Creek pyrg
Pyrgulopsis gibba Hershler, 1995 - Surprise Valley pyrg
Pyrgulopsis gilae (Taylor, 1987) - Gila springsnail
Pyrgulopsis giuliani Hershler & Pratt, 1990 - southern Sierra Nevada springsnail
Pyrgulopsis glandulosa Hershler, 1988 - Verde Rim springsnail
Pyrgulopsis greggi Hershler, 1995 - Kern River pyrg
Pyrgulopsis hamlinensis Hershler, 1998 - Hamlin Valley pyrg
Pyrgulopsis hendersoni (Pilsbry, 1933) - Harney Lake springsnail
Pyrgulopsis idahoensis (Pilsbry, 1933) - Idaho springsnail
Pyrgulopsis ignota Hershler, Liu & Lang, 2010
Pyrgulopsis intermedia (Tryon, 1865) - Crooked Creek springsnail
Pyrgulopsis isolata Hershler & Sada, 1987 - elongate-gland springsnail
Pyrgulopsis kolobensis (Taylor, 1987) - Toquerville springsnail
Pyrgulopsis licina Hershler, Liu & Bradford, 2013
Pyrgulopsis longae Hershler, 1995 - Long Valley pyrg
Pyrgulopsis longinqua (Gould, 1855)
Pyrgulopsis marilynae (Hershler, Ratcliffe, Liu, Lang and Hay, 2014)
Pyrgulopsis merriami (Pilsbry & Beecher, 1892) - Pahranagat pebblesnail
Pyrgulopsis metcalfi (Taylor, 1987) - Naegele springsnail
Pyrgulopsis micrococcus (Pilsbry, 1893) - Oasis Valley springsnail
Pyrgulopsis milleri Hershler & Liu, 2010
Pyrgulopsis minkleyi (D. W. Taylor, 1966)
Pyrgulopsis montezumensis Hershler, 1988 - Montezuma Well springsnail
Pyrgulopsis morrisoni Hershler, 1988 - Page springsnail
Pyrgulopsis nanus Hershler & Sada, 1987 - distal-gland springsnail
Pyrgulopsis neomexicana (Pilsbry, 1916) - Socorro springsnail
Pyrgulopsis nevadensis (Stearns, 1883) - corded pyrg - type species
Pyrgulopsis nonaria (Hershler, 1998) - Ninemile pyrg
Pyrgulopsis owensensis Hershler, 1989 - Owens Valley springsnail
Pyrgulopsis pecosensis (Taylor, 1987) - Pecos springsnail
Pyrgulopsis perforata Hershler, Liu & Bradford, 2013
Pyrgulopsis perturbata Hershler, 1989 - Fish Slough springsnail
Pyrgulopsis pilsbryana (J. L. Baily & R. I. Baily, 1952) - Bear Lake springsnail
Pyrgulopsis pisteri Hershler & Sada, 1987 - Median-gland Nevada springsnail
Pyrgulopsis robusta (Walker, 1908) - Jackson Lake springsnail
Pyrgulopsis roswellensis (Taylor, 1987) - Roswell springsnail
Pyrgulopsis sanchezi Hershler, Liu & Bradford, 2013
Pyrgulopsis saxatilis (Hershler, 1998) - sub-globose snake pyrg
Pyrgulopsis similis (Hershler, Ratcliffe, Liu, Lang and Hay, 2014)
Pyrgulopsis simplex Hershler, 1988 - Fossil springsnail
Pyrgulopsis sola Hershler, 1988 - brown springsnail
Pyrgulopsis stearnsiana (Pilsbry, 1899) - Yaqui springsnail
Pyrgulopsis taylori Hershler, 1995 - San Luis Obispo pyrg
Pyrgulopsis texana (Pilsbry, 1935) - Phantom cave snail
Pyrgulopsis thermalis (Taylor, 1987) - New Mexico hot springsnail
Pyrgulopsis thompsoni Hershler, 1988 - Huachuca springsnail
Pyrgulopsis transversa (Hershler, 1998) - southern Bonneville pyrg
Pyrgulopsis trivialis (Taylor, 1987) - Three Forks springsnail
Pyrgulopsis turbatrix Hershler, 1998 - Southeast Nevada Pyrg
Pyrgulopsis variegata - Northwest Bonneville pyrg
Pyrgulopsis ventricosa Hershler, 1995 - Clear Lake pyrg
Pyrgulopsis wongi Hershler, 1989

Eastern North American species of Pyrgulopsis are considered to be in separate genus Marstonia according to the Thompson and Hershler (2002).
Pyrgulopsis agarhecta (F. G. Thompson, 1969) - Ocmulgee marstonia - Marstonia agarhecta F.G. Thompson, 1969
Pyrgulopsis arga  - ghost marstonia - Marstonia arga F.G. Thompson, 1977
Pyrgulopsis castor (F. G. Thompson, 1977) - beaverpond marstonia - Marstonia castor F.G. Thompson, 1977
Pyrgulopsis halcyon (F. G. Thompson, 1977) - halcyon marstonia - Marstonia halcyon F.G. Thompson, 1977
Pyrgulopsis hershleri F. G. Thompson, 1995 - Coosa pyrg - Marstonia hershleri (F.G. Thompson, 1995)
Pyrgulopsis letsoni (Walker, 1901) - gravel pyrg - Marstonia letsoni (Walker, 1901)
Pyrgulopsis lustrica (Pilsbry, 1890) - boreal marstonia - Marstonia lustrica (Pilsbry, 1890)
Pyrgulopsis ogmoraphe (F. G. Thompson, 1977) - royal springsnail - Marstonia ogmorhaphe (F.G. Thompson, 1977)
Pyrgulopsis olivacea (Pilsbry, 1895) - olive marstonia - Marstonia olivacea (Pilsbry, 1895)
Pyrgulopsis ozarkensis Hinkley, 1915 - Ozark pyrg - Marstonia ozarkensis (Hinkley, 1915)
Pyrgulopsis pachyta (F. G. Thompson, 1977) - armored marstonia - Marstonia pachyta F.G. Thompson, 1977
Pyrgulopsis scalariformis (Wolf, 1869) - moss pyrg - Marstonia scalariformis (Wolf, 1869)

References
This article incorporates public domain text from the reference.

Further reading

External links 

 Roden T. D. (last change 25 May 2001). AQUATIC SNAIL (possibly Pyrgulopsis).

 
Hydrobiidae
Gastropod genera
Taxonomy articles created by Polbot